Without Pity is a 1948 Italian film directed by Alberto Lattuada from a script by the director himself, Federico Fellini and Tullio Pinelli, from an original story by Ettore Margadonna.

Plot
As World War II ends, African-American army sergeant Jerry Jackson is stationed in Italy. Local gangsters want to use him as a conduit to obtain supplies that the military has access to which can then be sold on the black market, but Jerry remains honest and refuses their attempts to bribe him. Soon however, he falls in love with Angela, an Italian woman who had earlier helped save his life and who now finds herself stranded in the area in a fruitless attempt to find her brother. Realizing that Angela is perilously close to having to turn to prostitution, Jerry relents and makes a deal with the gangsters, hoping to make enough money to support Angela. After he is caught and jailed, Jerry escapes from his prison camp and deserts, searching for a way that he and Angela can run away to be together.

Cast
 Carla Del Poggio as Angela
 John Kitzmiller as Jerry
 Pierre Claudé as Pierre Luigi
 Giulietta Masina as Marcella
 Folco Lulli as Giacomo 
 Lando Muzio as South American Captain

Reception
Without Pity was banned in the United States and British occupation zones in Germany, but was a success at the box-office in Italy.

References
Notes

External links

1948 films
Italian black-and-white films
Films scored by Nino Rota
Films about interracial romance
1940s Italian-language films
Films set in Italy
Films set in Livorno
Films with screenplays by Federico Fellini
Films directed by Alberto Lattuada
Lux Film films
Italian crime drama films
1948 crime drama films
Censored films
1940s Italian films